Brinje is a settlement south of Šentrupert in the historical region of Lower Carniola in southeastern Slovenia. The Municipality of Šentrupert is now included in the Southeast Slovenia Statistical Region.

References

External links
Brinje at Geopedia

Populated places in the Municipality of Šentrupert